Robert Horn (born February 6, 1954 in Salem, Oregon), was a National Football League linebacker from 1976-1983. He was a member of 1971-1972 class 3 high school football championship team at South Salem High School.  He played college football at Oregon State University and was selected in the 4th round (95th overall) by the San Diego Chargers in the 1976 NFL Draft.  He would play for the Chargers until the 1982 season, where he played for the San Francisco 49ers in his last two seasons.

References

1954 births
Living people
Sportspeople from Salem, Oregon
Players of American football from Oregon
American football linebackers
Oregon State Beavers football players
San Diego Chargers players
San Francisco 49ers players
New Jersey Generals players
South Salem High School alumni